Uraró, also known as araró or arrowroot cookies, are Filipino cookies made from arrowroot flour. They have a dry and powdery texture and are usually flower-shaped. They originate from the Tagalog people of southern Luzon, particularly in the provinces of Laguna, Quezon, and Marinduque.

Etymology
The name is derived from uraró (also araró, araru, aroru, or aruru), the Tagalog and Spanish common name of the maranta arrowroot, Maranta arundinacea, the source of the flour. It is also called  (Spanish for 'Liliw biscuits'), after the town of Liliw in Laguna, where it is a regional specialty.

Description

Traditional uraró production is labor-intensive, starting with the harvesting of arrowroots. The water is poured off and the starchy mass is kneaded to extract more water. Finally the starch is dried and sieved through  (muslin) to produce the flour. The entire process takes an entire day. The flour is then mixed with rendered lard, duck egg yolks, sugar, and milk.

Modern uraró, however, are usually made from arrowroot flour, sugar, milk, margarine (or butter), and eggs. In some cases, arrowroot flour is even substituted with tapioca flour or rice flour, resulting in poorer quality cookies. Uraró can also be modified with other ingredients like coconut cream or maple syrup. Both of these versions usually lack the melt-in-the-mouth quality of traditional uraró made with pure arrowroot flour and lard.

Uraró are traditionally sold in cylindrical stacks wrapped in colored crêpe paper. Uraró are similar in texture and are sometimes confused with puto seco, another powdery Filipino biscuit. But uraró are not as dry as puto seco and have a milky and buttery taste.

See also
Puto seco
Mamon tostado
Rosquillos

References 

Philippine cuisine
Cookies